Gymnopus dryophilus is a mushroom commonly found in temperate woodlands of Europe and North America. It is generally saprophytic, but occasionally also attacks living wood. It belongs to section Levipedes of the genus, being characterized by a smooth stem having no hairs at the base (in contrast to section Vestipedes).  Until recently it was most frequently known as Collybia dryophila.

Description 
The gills, which are only thinly attached to the stem (detaching with age), are whitish and crowded. The spore powder is white; the buff spores do not react in Melzer's reagent. The taste is palatable.

Microscopically the spores are 6×3 µm in size and slightly tear-shaped, there are lobed club-shaped cystidia (15–50 µm × 2–6 µm), and the hyphae on the cap cuticle can also have lobes.
It is contended that G. dryophilus in fact consists of a complex of different species and that several new species (including G. brunneolus, G. earleae and G. subsulphureus) should be split off from it.  However these species are not generally recognized at present.

One similar species is Rhodocollybia butyracea, which has a pinkish spore deposit, and some of the spores turn reddish-brown in Melzer's reagent.

The species may carry the parasite Syzygospora mycetophila, which causes pale growths on the mushroom surface.

Distribution and habitat
This fungus is very common in northern hemisphere temperate woodlands (so much so that it is sometimes considered a "weed" mushroom). It fruits from April to December and is often seen when there are few other fungi in evidence. Although the Greek epithet dryophilus means "lover of oak trees", it is also found with other broad-leaved trees and with conifers.

Grows in arcs and fairy rings in oak and pine woods, or as clusters on wood chip mulch from May to October.

Edibility
Gymnopus dryophilus contains toxins which may cause severe gastrointestinal issues. However, it has been listed as edible by some sources, though not worthwhile. It is recommended not to eat the stem, which is tough.

It has been found to contain anti-inflammatory beta-glucans.

The mushroom has a sweet nutty flavor and should not be eaten in contaminated places like industrial or near roads due to its capacity to take up mercury. It is edible but may cause gastrointestinal issues in some people.

References

External links 
Index Fungorum
USDA ARS Fungal Database
“Gymnopus dryophilus” by Robert Sasata, Healing-Mushrooms.net, December, 2007.
Kuo, M. (2008, May) Gymnopus dryophilus at the MushroomExpert.Com Web site

Fungal plant pathogens and diseases
Fungi of Europe
Marasmiaceae
Taxa named by Jean Baptiste François Pierre Bulliard